Sohray Kallah Qazi (also Romanized as Şoḩrāy Kallāh Qāẕī) is a village in Dasht Rural District, in the Central District of Shahreza County, Isfahan Province, Iran. At the 2006 census, its population was 11, in 7 families.

References 

Populated places in Shahreza County